Rakesh Sethi may refer to:
 Rakesh Sethi (banker)
 Rakesh Sethi (chef)